Midorigaoka Station may refer to multiple railway stations in Japan:

 Midorigaoka Station (Tokyo) on the Tokyu Oimachi Line
 Midorigaoka Station (Hyogo) on the Shintetsu Ao Line
 Midorigaoka Station (Hokkaido) on the Furano Line